The Beat, formerly Sapulso is a Philippine television informative show broadcast by QTV. It premiered on July 31, 2006. The show concluded on February 14, 2011.

Overview
It features comprehensive, informative and up-to-date issues both local and abroad. Segments of these program will be more profound such as Ivan's Talk of Current Issues, Mariz' 'Female Style, Gadgets, and Awareness, Techie Talk, Valeries' Exclusives Talks, Interviews and Latest Fashion Spots, lastly Tonipet's Top Favorites in Cuisines'' more popularly known as Tara Let's Eat.

Hosts
 Ivan Mayrina

Segment hosts
 Patani
 Tonipet Gaba
 Monica Verallo
 Betong Sumaya
 Mariz Umali

Former hosts
 Valerie Tan
 Miriam Quiambao

2006 Philippine television series debuts
2011 Philippine television series endings
Filipino-language television shows
GMA Integrated News and Public Affairs shows
Philippine television shows
Q (TV network) original programming